The 1968 USA Outdoor Track and Field Championships men's competition took place between June 19-21 at Hughes Stadium on the campus of Sacramento City College in Sacramento, California. The women's division held their championships separately almost two months later, combined with the Girls Track and Field Championships at Aurora Public School Stadium in Aurora, Colorado.  The 20K race walk took place in Long Beach, California on June 29.

The anticipation of the 1968 Summer Olympics affected the choice of Aurora due to the high altitude.  The late August date because the entire track and field calendar shifted later due to the late October dates for the Olympics.  Being an Olympic year, all races were run in meters.

It was at this meet, on the evening of June 20, 1968, when three men, Jim Hines, Ronnie Ray Smith and Charlie Greene, bettered the (hand timed) world record in the 100 metres (and several others were very close), is famous amongst track and field historians as the "Night of Speed."  Hand timing was the official timing system for track and field worldwide for another 9 years.  During that time, the record was equalled a further 11 times by six additional individuals but was never beaten.

Results

Men track events

Semi-finals
Semi-final 1 (Wind +0.8 mps)

Semi-final 2 (Wind +0.9 mps)

Heats
Heat 1 (Wind +2.8 mps)

Heat 2 (Wind +2.8 mps)

Heat 3 (Wind +2.7 mps)

Heat 4 (Wind +2.0 mps)

Men field events

Women track events

Women field events

See also
United States Olympic Trials (track and field)

References

 Results from T&FN
 results

USA Outdoor Track and Field Championships
Usa Outdoor Track And Field Championships, 1968
Track and field
Track and field in California
Outdoor Track and Field Championships
Outdoor Track and Field Championships
Outdoor Track and Field Championships